|}

The Jane Seymour Mares' Novices' Hurdle is a Grade 2 National Hunt hurdle race in Great Britain which is open to mares aged four years or older. It is run at Sandown Park over a distance of about 2 miles and 4 furlongs (2 miles 3 furlongs and 173 yards or ) and during the race there are nine hurdles to be jumped. The race is scheduled to take place each year in February.

The race was first run in 2013 as a Listed race and was upgraded to Grade 2 status in 2016.

Winners

See also
 Horse racing in Great Britain
 List of British National Hunt races

References

Racing Post: 

National Hunt races in Great Britain
Sandown Park Racecourse
National Hunt hurdle races
Recurring sporting events established in 2013
2013 establishments in England